Softball competitions at the 2015 Pan American Games in Toronto was held from July 12 to 26 at the Pan Am Ball Park, in Ajax, Ontario. Men's softball returned to the Pan American Games sports program after last being competed in 2003. A total of six men and women's teams competed in each tournament respectively.

Competition schedule

The following is the competition schedule for the softball competitions:

Medal summary

Medal table

Medalists

Qualification
A total of six men's teams and six women's team qualified to compete at the games. The top six teams (including Canada) at the 2013 Pan American Women's championships and 2014 Pan American Men's championships qualified to compete at the games. Each team can contain a maximum of fifteen athletes.

Men

Women

Participating nations
A total of nine countries have qualified softball teams.

References

 
Events at the 2015 Pan American Games
softball
2015 in softball
International softball competitions hosted by Canada